The 28th Stinkers Bad Movie Awards were released by the Hastings Bad Cinema Society in 2006 to honour the worst films the film industry had to offer in 2005. The most nominated film of the year was Son of the Mask with ten nominations, which also had five wins. While the usual rotation of categories happened, one notable award introduced was the "Annie" Award; this was meant to call out a film for raising ticket admission prices to inflate box office receipts just like Annie back in 1982. The award, handpicked by Stinkers founders Ray Wright and Mike Lancaster, went to The Producers, as listed below. Dishonourable mentions are also featured for Worst Picture (33 total).

Winners and nominees

Worst Picture

Dishonourable Mentions

 Æon Flux (Paramount)
 The Adventures of Sharkboy and Lavagirl in 3-D (Dimension)
  Are We There Yet? (Columbia)
 Bad News Bears (Paramount)
 Be Cool (MGM)
 The Brothers Grimm (Dimension)
 The Cave (Screen Gems)
 Chicken Little (Disney)
 Constantine (Warner Bros.)
 Diary of a Mad Black Woman (Lionsgate)
 Domino (New Line)
 Doom (Universal)
 The Dukes of Hazzard (Warner Bros.)
 Elektra (Fox)
 Fantastic Four (Fox)
 The Fog (Columbia)
 Fun with Dick and Jane (Columbia)
 Get Rich or Die Tryin' (Paramount)
 Herbie: Fully Loaded (Disney)
 The Hitchhiker's Guide to the Galaxy (Touchstone)
 The Honeymooners (Paramount)
 Hoodwinked! (TWC)
 House of D (Lionsgate)
 House of Wax (Warner Bros.)
 The Island (DreamWorks)
 Jiminy Glick in Lalawood (MGM)
 Kicking & Screaming (Universal)
 The Longest Yard (Paramount)
 Mindhunters (Dimension)
 Miss Congeniality 2: Armed and Fabulous (Warner Bros.)
 Monster in Law (New Line)
 Mulan II (Disney)
 My Big Fat Independent Movie (Anchor Bay)
 My Date With Drew (DEJ)
 The Pacifier (Disney)
 Palindromes (Genius)
 The Perfect Man (Universal)
 The Producers (Universal)
 Racing Stripes (Warner Bros.)
  Rebound (FOX)
 Sahara (Paramount)
 A Sound of Thunder (Warner Bros.)
 Stealth (Columbia)
 Supercross (Fox)
 Undiscovered (Lionsgate)
 Valiant (Disney, Vanguard)
 War of the Worlds (Paramount)
 White Noise (Universal)
 xXx: State of the Union (Columbia)
  Yours, Mine & Ours (Paramount, MGM, Columbia)

Other Categories

The following films received multiple wins:

References 

Stinkers Bad Movie Awards
Stinkers Bad Movie Awards